Rudolf "Rudi" Rauer (15 January 1950 – 15 July 2014) was West German handball player who competed in the 1976 Summer Olympics. He was born in Unna, North Rhine-Westphalia. In 1976 he was part of the West German team which finished fourth in the Olympic tournament. He played five matches as goalkeeper.

References

1950 births
2014 deaths
People from Unna
Sportspeople from Arnsberg (region)
German male handball players
Olympic handball players of West Germany
Handball players at the 1976 Summer Olympics